The Shores-Mueller Company is a historic building located in Cedar Rapids, Iowa, United States. The original section of the building was completed in 1911. Its construction utilized the Turner Cap system, which is a concrete flat-slab support system. The building housed the catalog company Shores-Mueller, which produced, packaged, and sold a variety of household and farm products from here. Two additions were built on to the original structure, the last being in 1969. The building is three-stories, constructed in brick, and lacking in ornamentation. Tom Erger, Devonna Wood, and Mike Pitzen acquired the building in 2005 and renovated it into the Shores Central Park, which hosts a variety of functions. It was listed on the National Register of Historic Places in 2020.

References

External links

Industrial buildings completed in 1911
Buildings and structures in Cedar Rapids, Iowa
National Register of Historic Places in Cedar Rapids, Iowa
Industrial buildings and structures on the National Register of Historic Places in Iowa